David Andreoli (born September 29, 1982) is a Swiss/Italian football (soccer) midfielder.

During his career, Andreoli has  played for FC Luzern, FC Lugano, SC Kriens, FC Sursee, SC Cham and SC Buochs.

External links

1982 births
Living people
Swiss men's footballers
FC Luzern players
FC Lugano players
SC Kriens players
SC Cham players
Association football midfielders